Prostaglandin E is a family of naturally occurring prostaglandins that are used as medications.

Types include:
 Prostaglandin E1 also known as alprostadil
 Prostaglandin E2 also known as dinoprostone

Both types are on the World Health Organization's List of Essential Medicines.

Prostaglandin E play an important role in thermoregulation of the human brain. Decreased formation of prostaglandin E through inhibition of cyclooxygenase is the basis for the antipyretic of nonsteroidal anti-inflammatory drugs (NSAIDs).

References

External links 
 
 
 

Prostaglandins
World Health Organization essential medicines